Goodenia bellidifolia, commonly known as daisy goodenia, is a species of flowering plant in the family Goodeniaceae and is endemic to eastern Australia. It is an erect, perennial herb with egg-shaped to lance-shaped leaves with the narrower end towards the base, spikes or thyrses of lemon-yellow to orange flowers, and oval to more or less spherical fruit.

Description

Taxonomy and naming
Goodenia bellidifolia was first formally described in 1794 by James Edward Smith in Transactions of the Linnean Society of London. 

In 1981 Surrey Wilfrid Laurance Jacobs and J. Pickard described two subspecies, Goodenia belliodifolia subsp. A and the autonym Goodenia bellidifolia Sm. bellidifolia in Plants of New South Wales. In 1990, subspecies A was formalised as Goodenia bellidifolia subsp. argentea by Roger Charles Carolin in the journal Telopea and both names are accepted at the Australian Plant Census:

Distribution and habitat
Daisy goodenia grows in heath and forest from the Moreton and Wide Bay districts of Queensland, through eastern New South Wales and as far west as Dubbo to the Genoa area in the far north-east of Victoria. Subspecies argentea occurs in the northern part of the species' distribution, north from near Wingham and subspecies bellidifolia south from Glen Innes.

References

bellidifolia
Flora of Queensland
Flora of New South Wales
Flora of Victoria (Australia)
Plants described in 1794
Taxa named by James Edward Smith